Christopher Perkins (born 1 May 1992), is an athlete from Canada, who competes in compound archery. He won the individual gold medal at the 2011 World Archery Championships, his first senior World Archery competition.

References

1992 births
Living people
Canadian male archers
World Archery Championships medalists
Competitors at the 2022 World Games
World Games bronze medalists
World Games medalists in archery
20th-century Canadian people
21st-century Canadian people